Karreg or Karag is a township in Nagarzê County in the Tibet Autonomous Region of China.

See also
List of towns and villages in Tibet

External links and references
Wikimapia

Populated places in Shannan, Tibet
Township-level divisions of Tibet
Nagarzê County